Colonel Robert Peel Dawson (1818 – 2 September 1877) was an Irish Member of the House of Commons at Westminster.

He was one of the Dawson family of Castledawson and lived at Moyola Park, County Londonderry. He was the son of The Rt. Hon. George Robert Dawson and Mary Peel, daughter of Sir Robert Peel, 1st Baronet and sister of Prime Minister of the United Kingdom Sir Robert Peel, 2nd Baronet.

He was appointed High Sheriff of County Londonderry for 1850 and served as MP for County Londonderry from 1859 to 1874.

His daughter, Mary, married Lord Adolphus John Spencer Churchill Chichester, younger son of Lord Donegall; thus his grandson was the South Londonderry MP Robert Chichester and his great-great-grandsons were Lord Moyola, Prime Minister of Northern Ireland and the Londonderry MP Robin Chichester-Clark.

References

External links 

1818 births
1877 deaths
Grenadier Guards officers
High Sheriffs of County Londonderry
Lord-Lieutenants of County Londonderry
Members of the Parliament of the United Kingdom for County Londonderry constituencies (1801–1922)
People from County Londonderry
UK MPs 1859–1865
UK MPs 1865–1868
UK MPs 1868–1874
11th Hussars officers